Aphaenopidius is a genus of beetles in the family Carabidae.

Species
The genus includes the following species:

 Aphaenopidius kamnikensis Drovenik, 1987
 Aphaenopidius treulandi J. Muller, 1909

References

Trechinae